Preston South was a parliamentary constituency in the city of Preston in Lancashire.  It returned one Member of Parliament (MP)  to the House of Commons of the Parliament of the United Kingdom.

The constituency was created by the House of Commons (Redistribution of Seats) Act 1949 for the 1950 general election, and abolished for the 1983 general election. From the 1983 election onwards, the areas covered by Preston South were moved to Preston and South Ribble.

Boundaries
The County Borough of Preston wards of Ashton, Avenham, Christ Church, Maudland, St John's, St Peter's, and Trinity, and the Urban District of Walton-le-Dale.

Members of Parliament

Election results

Elections in the 1950s

Elections in the 1960s

Elections in the 1970s

References

Parliamentary constituencies in North West England (historic)
Constituencies of the Parliament of the United Kingdom established in 1950
Constituencies of the Parliament of the United Kingdom disestablished in 1983
Politics of Preston